Prorophora senganella is a species of snout moth. It is found in Iran.

References

Phycitinae
Moths described in 1951